The Professor of Hebrew and Semitic Languages is a position at the University of Glasgow in Scotland. It was established in 1709 by Queen Anne as the Chair of Oriental Languages. The title was changed in 1893.

Professors of Oriental Languages/Professors of Hebrew and Semitic Languages
 Charles Morthland MA (1709)
 Alexander Dublop MA LLD (1745)
 William Rouet MA (1751)
 George Muirhead MA (1753)
 John Anderson MA (1755)
 James Buchanan MA (1757)
 Patick Cumin MA LLD (1761)
 Robert Trail MA DD (1761)
 Gavin Gibb MA LLD (1820)
 William Fleming MA DD (1831)
 George Gray DD (1839)
 Duncan Harkness Weir MA DD (1850)
 James Robertson MA DD (1877)
 William Barron Stevenson MA DLitt LLD DD (1907)
 Cecil James Mullo Weir MA DPhil DD (1937)
 John McDonald MA BD PhD STM (1968-1987)

References
Who, What and Where: The History and Constitution of the University of Glasgow.  Compiled by Michael Moss, Moira Rankin and Lesley Richmond)

See also
List of Professorships at the University of Glasgow

Hebrew and Semitic Languages
Hebrew and Semitic Languages
1709 establishments in Scotland
Hebrew language
Semitic studies